The Canon PowerShot S80 is an 8.0 megapixel digital camera originally released in 2005. The PowerShot S80 is the successor of Canon PowerShot S70. At introduction, its MSRP was US$599.

Features
 8.0 megapixels
 JPEG (Exif 2.2) support
 Film speed equivalent of ISO 50–400
 Wide-angle zoom lens 28 mm–105 mm
 Completely manual settings
 DIGIC II

Sample photos

References

 Canon S80 Review on DPReview, Retrieved November 1, 2006

External links

S80

pl:Canon PowerShot S80